"I Said a Prayer" is a song written by Leslie Satcher, and recorded by American country music artist Pam Tillis.  It was released in May 1998 as the first single from the album Every Time.  The song reached #12 on the Billboard Hot Country Singles & Tracks chart.

Chart performance

Year-end charts

References

1998 singles
Pam Tillis songs
Songs written by Leslie Satcher
Song recordings produced by Billy Joe Walker Jr.
Arista Nashville singles
1998 songs